"Let My People Go" is a phrase that originates in the Book of Exodus 5:1:

Let My People Go may also refer to:

Film
Let My People Go: The Story of Israel, a 1965 film
 Let My People Go! (2011 film)

Music
"Go Down Moses", traditional song known for the line
"Let My People Go!", a line from the song "All You Zombies" by The Hooters
"Let My People Go", a line from the song "Creeping Death" by Metallica
"Let My People Go", a song by Donny Osmond from the album Portrait of Donny
"Let My People Go", a song by The Pursuit of Happiness from the album Love Junk
"Let My People Go", a 1968 song by Brother Jack McDuff from the album The Natural Thing
"Let My People Go", a song by The Winans
"Let My People Go", a cover of "Go Down Moses" by Diamanda Galás from the album You Must Be Certain of the Devil
Let My People Go, an album by Darondo
Let My People Go-Go, a song by The Rainmakers

Other
 "Let My People Go", a 1943 pamphlet by Victor Gollancz

See also 
 "Let My People Be", a song by the Tom Robinson Band on the 1979 album TRB Two
 Let My People Come, an explicit musical about sex which premiered in 1974
 "Let My People Live!", a series of events instituted in 2005 by the World Holocaust Foundation to preserve memories of the Holocaust